LaSalle is an 'L' station on the CTA's Blue Line. It is a subway station with a single island platform located at 150 West Ida B. Wells Drive in the Loop district of Chicago, Illinois.

History
LaSalle station opened on February 25, 1951, as the southern terminal of the Milwaukee-Dearborn subway on the CTA's Milwaukee Avenue route. It remained a terminal station until it was connected to the new Congress Expressway route in June 1958.

Location
The station is located at 150 West Ida B. Wells Drive in the Loop district of Chicago, Illinois. It is the closest station to LaSalle Street Station, terminal for Rock Island District Metra trains.

Bus and rail connections
CTA
 24 Wentworth
36 Broadway 

Metra
 LaSalle Street Station

References

External links
LaSalle Street entrance from Google Maps Street View

CTA Blue Line stations
Railway stations in the United States opened in 1951